Florida is divided into 28 congressional districts, each represented by a member of the United States House of Representatives. After the 2020 census, the number of Florida's seats was increased from 27 to 28, due to the state's increase in population, and subsequent reapportionment in 2022.

The Florida congressional districts are represented in the 118th United States Congress by 8 Democrats and 20 Republicans.

History

2010 redistricting

In 2010 more than 63 percent of Florida voters approved the initiated Amendments 5 and 6, known as the "Fair District Amendments," to the state constitution, over the objections of the Republican-controlled legislature. These are intended to promote fairness in congressional districts and "prohibit lawmakers from intentionally drawing districts that favor incumbents or political parties."

The legislature had adopted new districts in 2012 as a result of the 2010 census. Their product was soon challenged in early 2011 by groups who had worked for passage of the amendments, including the League of Women Voters and Common Cause. The trial revealed much secret dealings by party operatives and lawmakers; the court set a new legal standard. At one point the court excluded the press and shut down the TV feed in order to allow three hours of testimony by a political operative.

On July 9, 2014, a Florida judge ruled that state Republicans had illegally drawn the state's congressional districts. Judge Terry P. Lewis of Florida's Second Judicial Circuit ordered that the 5th and 10th districts be redrawn. On appeal, the Florida Supreme Court ruled on July 9, 2015 that several more districts had to be redrawn, and that the legislature had unconstitutionally worked to benefit the Republican Party. The historic ruling was considered likely to affect most of the state's 27 districts.

On December 2, 2015, the state supreme court approved a remedial plan for districting for the 2016 elections. All but Districts 1, 8, and 19 were altered in some way by the plan.

2020 redistricting

Current districts and representatives
List of members of the United States House delegation from Florida, their terms, their district boundaries, and the district political ratings according to the CPVI. The delegation has a total of 28 members, including 8 Democrats and 20 Republicans.

Historical district boundaries

Obsolete districts
Florida's at-large congressional district
Florida Territory's at-large congressional district

See also
List of United States congressional districts

Notes
28 districts.

References

External links